Sante Piatti (1687–1747) was an Italian painter of the Baroque period, active mainly in his native Venice. He is attributed to be a pupil of Giuseppe Diamantini, and possibly Gregorio Lazzarini. He appears to be influenced by Sebastiano Ricci. During 1726 and 1727 he was a member of the Venetian painter's guild (Fraglia). He painted a series of works for the Scuola Grande dei Carmini in Venice and an altarpiece of St Antony for the church of San Nicolò dei Mendicoli.

Paintings from the Carmini, Venice

References

1687 births
1747 deaths
Italian male painters
18th-century Italian painters
Painters from Venice
18th-century Italian male artists